Tamás Faragó (born 20 March 1978) is a musician, best known as the lead guitarist of Amber Smith and We Are Rockstars.

Early life and personal life
Faragó was born in Cegléd, Hungary.

We Are Rockstars

Faragó is the founding member of the Hungarian indie band We Are Rockstars along with György Ligeti.

Amber Smith

Faragó joined the Hungarian indie band Amber Smith in 2014. He played on the sixth full length studio album entitled Modern.

In 2019 he left Amber Smith.

Discography
With We Are Rockstars:
Albums
 Lights (2017)
 Second (2013)
 Let It Beat (2011)

With Amber Smith:
Albums
 New (2017)
 Modern (2015)

With Nemjuci
Albums
 Nemjuci (2012)
 Nemjuci (2009)

Instruments

Guitars
 Ibanez Talman

Effect pedals
Boss SD-1
Boss DD-3
Boss TU-3
Pro Co RAT
Ibanez

Amplifiers
Orange

See also
Budapest indie music scene
Amber Smith
Imre Poniklo

References

External links
 Faragó on Bandcamp

1982 births
Living people
Hungarian indie rock musicians